PH7 may refer to:

 The center of the pH scale, describing a solution in water that is neither basic nor acidic.
 pH7 (Peter Hammill album), an album by Peter Hammill